
Gmina Włodowice is a rural gmina (administrative district) in Zawiercie County, Silesian Voivodeship, in southern Poland.

Villages
Gmina Włodowice contains the villages and settlements of Góra Włodowska, Hucisko, Kopaniny, Morsko, Parkoszowice, Rudniki, Rzędkowice, Skałka, Włodowice and Zdów.

Neighbouring gminas
Gmina Włodowice is bordered by the towns of Myszków and Zawiercie, and by the gminas of Kroczyce, Niegowa and Żarki.

Twin towns – sister cities

Gmina Włodowice is twinned with:
 Lamerdingen, Germany
 Oravský Podzámok, Slovakia

External links

Wlodowice
Zawiercie County